The  is a Japanese non-profit organization founded in 1947. Roger Nash Baldwin of the ACLU played an important role in its founding.  The JCLU aims to protect human rights, and bases its operation on international human rights standards, principally the Universal Declaration of Human Rights.  It is affiliated with the International Commission of Jurists (ICJ) and the International League for Human Rights (ILHR).

References

External links
 
 
Books.google.com

Civil liberties advocacy groups
Organizations established in 1947
1947 establishments in Japan